Half-inch tape refers to magnetic tape with a width of  in a format such as:

 Computer magnetic tape data storage
 Reel-to-reel
 UNISERVO
 IBM 7 track
 IBM 9 track
 Cartridge
 IBM 3480
 IBM 3590
 IBM 3592
 Digital Linear Tape (DLT)
 Linear Tape-Open (LTO)
 Videotape
 Reel-to-reel
 CV-2000
 EIAJ-1
 Video cassette
 Betacam
 Betamax
 VHS
 S-VHS